The North west Line of Chennai Suburban Railway is the fifth longest line that runs west–north from Chennai City. Suburban services terminate at Tiruttani and MEMU services run till Tirupati, across the state line in Andhra Pradesh.

Sections

Chennai Central MMC - Thiruvallur

 This section has 2 dedicated lines for suburban train operations apart from 2 main lines for mixed traffic.
 EMUs are operated along 3rd and 4th main lines during peak hours.
 5th and 6th rail lines are planned.
 9-car and 12-car EMU are operated in this sector.

Thiruvallur - Arakkonam

 Suburban trains operate in the 2 main lines.
 3rd rail line is completed & 4th rail line will be completed in 2015.
 9-car and 12-car EMU are operated in this sector.

Arakkonam - Tiruttani

 Suburban trains operate in the 2 main lines.

Chennai Central MMC - Tirupati
 MEMU trains operate between Chennai Central and Tirupati.

Chennai Suburban Railway